The Men's Foil Individual B wheelchair fencing competition at the 2004 Summer Paralympics was held on 18 September at the Helliniko Fencing Hall.

The event was won by Hui Charn Hung, representing .

Results

Preliminaries

Pool A

Pool B

Pool C

Pool D

Competition bracket

References

M